Kokuzna vremena ("Broke Times") is the first studio album released by the former Yugoslavia's Merlin band. The album was released in 1985.

Track listing

Personnel
Performers (band members) — Dino Merlin, Džaf Saračević, Mensur Lutvica, Enver "Mili" Milišić, Tula Bjelanović
Photography and artwork — Z. Cico
Producer and engineer — Brano Likić

External links
Kokuzna vremena on Dino Merlin's official web site
Kokuzna vremena on Discogs

Dino Merlin albums
1985 albums